Air Cadet is a 1951 American drama war film directed by Joseph Pevney and starring Stephen McNally, Gail Russell, Alex Nicol and Richard Long. Air Cadet featured United States Air Force (USAF) pilots in training along with actors mixed into the training courses.  The film had a small early role for 26-year-old Rock Hudson and a scene with future astronaut Gus Grissom.

Plot
In 1951,  Walt Carver (Robert Arthur), Russ Coulter (Richard Long), Jerry Connell (James Best) and former U.S. Army Sgt. Joe Czanoczek (Alex Nicol) join a group of cadets beginning air force pilot training. Each of the cadets have their own reasons for being in the United States Air Force with Carver attempting to overcome his privileged background, Coulter wanting to emulate his brother who had died in World War II, Connell trading on his prior background as a civilian pilot, and Sgt. Czanoczek vying to make his wartime military experience count.

Besides flying, the trainees have to contend with upperclassmen who are intent on hazing the newcomers. After primary training at Randolph Field on AT-6 Texan aircraft, the group loses one of their group, with Connell "washing out" and opting to become a navigator. All the others successfully solo and await their next assignment.

The rest of the group of trainees including Czanoczek, who wanted to fly B-25 Mitchell medium bombers, move on to advanced training on jet aircraft at Williams Air Force Base. There cadet Coulter meets and falls in love with Janet Page (Gail Russell), the estranged wife of one of the instructors, Major Jack Page (Stephen McNally), the leader of an F-80 Shooting Star jet aerobatics team based at Williams Air Force Base. His job is to identify and wash out unsuitable candidates and with the turmoil at home, Page homes in on Coulter.

The rivalry between the two puts Coulter's future as a fighter pilot in jeopardy. Janet realizes that Coulter has aggravated some of Page's former demons. He had been tormented by the guilt of sending men to their deaths in wartime. After being branded a coward by Page, Coulter's brother had committed suicide, a secret that had been gnawing at the trainee.

The pressure to solo erodes Coulter's confidence, and after an accident on his solo flight, he has to confront Major Page during the accident investigation. Coulter is cleared and allowed to continue training but both rivals are pitted against each other in the air when Page takes over Coulter's training. Page picks Coulter, Carver and Czanoczek as his wingmen in a new "Acrojets" flying team, but is sure that his rival will not be up to the task.

In a check flight the major and Coulter fly together in a two-seat trainer to see whether the young cadet will remain on the team. When his oxygen supply fails, Page loses consciousness and it is up to Coulter to bring the two of them home safely in a risky desert landing. Finally able to deal with his guilt, Page realizes that Coulter is not to blame. Janet finally reconciles with her husband, who is asked by his former rival to pin on his aviator wings, signifying Coulter's graduation as a fighter pilot.

Cast
 Stephen McNally as Major Jack Page
 Gail Russell as Janet Page
 Alex Nicol as Joe Czanoczek
 Richard Long as Russ Coulter
 Charles Drake as Captain Sullivan
 Robert Arthur as Walt Carver
 Rock Hudson as Upper Classman
 Peggie Castle as Pat
 James Best as Jerry Connell
 Parley Baer as Major Jim Evans

Production
Production of Air Cadet began at Randolph Air Force Base near San Antonio, Texas on October 4, 1950. The scenes at Randolph were filmed in five days and the cast and crew transferred to Williams Air Force Base near Mesa, Arizona where the majority of the film was shot, with filming wrapped mid-December 1950.  Some sequences were shot at Tyndall Air Force Base and Panama City, Florida. Before he became widely known as an astronaut, Gus Grissom was an extra who was briefly seen early in the film as a U.S. Air Force candidate for the Randolph flight school.

The aerial sequences which were the highlight of Air Cadet were shot by cinematographer de Vinna who shot from a B-25 bomber, converted into a camera platform. He had to lie on his stomach using a film camera bracketed onto the tail assembly of the B-25. Choosing high-contrast sky backgrounds meant when the sky was clear or blue, photography was not possible. Much of the flying was "done at an altitude at which G-forces were in effect, making everything, including the 60-pound camera and the photographers' own bodies, feel seven times heavier."

Reception
Although a B-movie, Air Cadet was rolled out with some flair. At the Fox West Coast Theater in Los Angeles, where the western premiere was held, a jet engine and cutaway aircraft were featured in a lobby display. Leonard Maltin's review was typical, "Familiar account of Air Force recruits training to become fighter pilots; McNally plays their tough but troubled flight commander. It's fun to see (Rock) Hudson barking orders at the recruits."

Aviation film historian Stephen Pendo in Aviation in the Cinema, characterized Air Cadet as routine fare. He did note that: "The aerial shots are the only bright lights in the whole film, and the best of these are the aerobatic sequences in which the men fly in a four-ship diamond formation with their wingtips 18 inches apart." Michael Paris in From the Wright Brothers to Top Gun: Aviation, Nationalism, and Popular Cinema, reviewed Air Cadet, saying, "The feature offered little that was new, and, indeed, owed a considerable debt to the earlier I Wanted Wings (1941)."

References

Notes

Citations

Bibliography

 Boomhower, Ray E. Gus Grissom: The Lost Astronaut. Indianapolis: Indiana Historical Society. 2004. .
 Melikian, Robert A. Vanishing Phoenix (Images of America). Mount Pleasant, South Carolina: Arcadia Publishing, 2010. .
 Paris, Michael. From the Wright Brothers to Top Gun: Aviation, Nationalism, and Popular Cinema. Manchester, UK: Manchester University Press, 1995. .
 Pendo, Stephen. Aviation in the Cinema. Lanham, Maryland: Scarecrow Press, 1985. .
 Thompson, Frank. Texas Hollywood: Filmmaking in San Antonio Since 1910. San Antonio: Maverick Publishing Company, 2002. .

External links
 
 
  (full movie)

1951 films
American aviation films
Films about the United States Air Force
American black-and-white films
Films directed by Joseph Pevney
Universal Pictures films
1950s war drama films
Films shot in San Antonio
American war drama films
1951 drama films
1950s English-language films
1950s American films